Bob and Mike Bryan were the defending champions, but Bob was unable to compete due to an injury. Mike played alongside James Cerretani, but lost in the first round to Scott Clayton and Joe Salisbury.

Luke Bambridge and Jonny O'Mara won the title, defeating Ken and Neal Skupski in the final, 7–5, 6–4.

Seeds

Draw

Draw

References
 Main Draw

Eastbourne International - Doubles
2018 Men's Doubles